MacEachron is a surname. Notable people with the surname include:

J. Reginald MacEachron, American architect and musical composer
Paul N. MacEachron (1889–1930), American college football and college basketball coach

See also
McEachron